Taralli are toroidal Italian snack foods, common in the southern half of the Italian Peninsula. A cracker similar in texture to a breadstick, a pretzel, a bublik,  a Sushki or baranki, taralli can be sweet or savory. Sweet taralli are sometimes glazed with sugar. Savory taralli may be flavored with onion, garlic, sesame seeds, poppy seeds, fennel, pepper, chili or just salt. Sweet and plain taralli are often dunked in wine.

Overview
According to Malcolm Gladwell in his book Outliers: The Story of Success, "Sweets such as biscotti and taralli used to be reserved for Christmas and Easter; in Roseto they were eaten year-round."

Ingredients for one commercially sold tarallini brand: wheat flour, yeast, water, olive oil, fennel seed, black pepper, salt, anise flavor.

References

External links
Taralli - Italian Food at about.com 

Crackers (food)
Sweet breads